The Oklahoma City Blazers were a professional ice hockey team that was based in Oklahoma City, Oklahoma. They competed in the Central Professional Hockey League from 1965 to 1977. The team played their home games in the Fairgrounds Arena, and later in The Myriad.

This team was created through the relocation of the Minneapolis Bruins, who began play in 1963 after originating as the Kingston Frontenacs of the defunct Eastern Professional Hockey League.
Initially they were a Boston Bruins farm team. The first coach was Harry Sinden, and NHL stars Bernie Parent, Gerry Cheevers, Doug Favell, Reggie Leach, Rick MacLeish, Wayne Cashman, Ivan Boldirev, J. P. Parise, Ross Lonsberry, Dallas Smith, Bill Goldsworthy and Jean Pronovost played for the Blazers.  The Bruins withdrew from the team in 1972, but after a season without hockey, Maple Leaf Gardens Limited announced that they would relocate their Tulsa Oilers club of the CHL to become the reborn Oklahoma City Blazers, with Tulsa getting a replacement independent team.  From 1973 to 1976 the team was affiliated with the Toronto Maple Leafs and their roster included Mike Palmateer, Blaine Stoughton, Pat Boutette and all-time NHL penalty leader Dave "Tiger" Williams.  Prior to the 1976-77 season the Maple Leafs decided to share the Dallas Black Hawks of the CHL with the Chicago Black Hawks as their affiliate, in an attempt to reduce costs.

Gregg Sheppard was the franchise's leading career scorer. Their home arenas were the Fairgrounds Arena and the Myriad Convention Center Arena. The Blazers won the CHL championship in 1966 under player-coach Harry Sinden and repeated in 1967.

John Brooks, sports director of the local CBS TV affiliate KWTV Channel 9 and radio play-by-play voice for high-profile University of Oklahoma football and men's basketball from 1978 to 1992, was the on-air voice of the original Blazers in the 1960s and 1970s. His catch phrase for Blazers same-day game radio ads was "Let's play hockey... TONIGHT!"

References

 
Defunct ice hockey teams in the United States
Central Professional Hockey League teams
Maple Leaf Sports & Entertainment
Toronto Maple Leafs minor league affiliates
Boston Bruins minor league affiliates
1965 establishments in Oklahoma
1977 disestablishments in Oklahoma
Ice hockey teams in Oklahoma
Sports in Oklahoma City
Ice hockey clubs established in 1965
Ice hockey clubs disestablished in 1977